Anthony De Souza (born 1943) is the director of the Board on Earth Sciences and Resources at the National Research Council of the National Academies.

Early life and education 
De Souza was born in London, England in 1943. De Souza holds B.A. (honors) and Ph.D. degrees from the University of Reading in England.

Career 
De Souza was executive director of the National Geography Standards Project at the National Geographic Society, secretary general of the 27th International Geographical Union Congress, editor of National Geographic Research & Exploration, and editor of the Journal of Geography.

He has held positions as a professor and as a visiting scholar at George Washington University, University of Wisconsin–Eau Claire, University of Minnesota, University of California-Berkeley, and University of Dar es Salaam in Tanzania. He has served as a member of NRC committees and currently serves on the Advisory Board for Biosphere 2.

De Souza has received numerous honors and awards, including the Medalla Benito Juárez in 1992 and the Gilbert Grosvenor honors award from the Association of American Geographers in 1996.

Works 
 A Geography of World Economy
 A geography of world economy 2

References 

1943 births
Alumni of the University of Reading
American geographers
Living people
University of Wisconsin–Eau Claire faculty
George Washington University faculty
University of Minnesota faculty
University of California, Berkeley faculty
Academic staff of the University of Dar es Salaam
National Geographic Society
Academics from London